The 1956–57 season was Manchester City's 55th season of competitive football and 40th season in the top division of English football. In addition to the First Division, the club competed in the FA Cup and the FA Charity Shield.

First Division

League table

Results summary

FA Charity Shield

References

External links

Manchester City F.C. seasons